Narowal  is a city located on the western bank of river Ravi in the northeast of the province Punjab, Pakistan. The city is the capital of district Narowal, and a part of the Gujranwala division. It is the 94th largest city of Pakistan. The economy is largely agriculture-based but Football production and handicrafts industries also exist. Narowal houses many universities campuses, including the University of Narowal, University of Engineering and Technology  Narowal Campus and the University of Veterinary and Animal Sciences Narowal Campus.

A famous Sikh Temple, Gurdwara Darbar Sahib Kartarpur lies in the East of Narowal.

Geography 
Narowal lies from 31° 55' to 32° 30' latitude and 74° 35' to 75° 21' longitude. It is located in the northeast part of Punjab, Pakistan, about 96 kilometers north of the provincial capital Lahore. The Narowal District borders Sialkot to the west, Sheikhupura to the South, Gurdaspur (Eastern Punjab, India) to the east, and the Kathua District and Jammu Kashmir to the north.

Etymology 
Although contradictory beliefs exist, the widely held narrative states that Narowal derived its name from a landlord Naro Singh Bajwa back in Sixteenth-century.

History  
In the sixteenth century, Narowal was a small village consisting of only a few houses of labourers around the farmhouse of Land-Lord Naro Singh Bajwa o.  The city is the capital of Narowal District. The history of modern Narowal dates back to 90 years when Britishers established a railway link between eastern and western Punjab in its bid to strengthen their grip over Punjab. With the establishment of the railway junctions, investment begins to flow and the city begins to flourish with the passage of time. After the partition and establishment of Pakistan, the railway line between the east and west Punjab was blown off for security reasons. Initially, Narowal was a part of Sialkot district, later gained the status of Tehsil before becoming the District in 1992.

Demography 
The population of Narowal consists of various ethnic groups including Punjabi almost 80%, the peoples who migrated from India to Pakistan in 1947 during partition (in Pakistan they are known as a mohajir)19%, and Pathan including other minor groups 1%. Punjabi is the predominant Language with Urdu second large language.

The majority religion is Islam 98%, Christians are 1.5% and Sikhs and Hindus are .5% approx.

Economy 

Narowal is an agro-based economy. Its fertile field produces high-quality rice, wheat, maze, corn, and Sugar cane. Rice especially produced in Narowal, is a major export and earn foreign exchange reserves for Pakistan. Wheat production secures food security of the country.
Except that football manufacturing especially stitching, handicraft is included among industries of Narowal. Various bazaars including Zafarwal Road bazaar, Railway Bazar, Chota Bazar, are famous commercial points while Circular Road Narowal is emerging as a new business hub in the city.

Education 
Narowal is known as the house of knowledge. Its literacy rate is highest among neighbouring districts. It is the house of various universities and colleges like the University of Narowal. Upgraded from the sub-campus of the University of Gujrat, Narowal campus, the university caters to the needs of youth.

University of Engineering and Technology Lahore, Narowal campus is another university located in Narowal.

University College of Veterinary and Animal Sciences is another university campus located on Shakargarh Road, Narowal.

Narowal public school is also one of the largest school in Narowal. C.M.S. High School Narowal is the oldest school in the region, owned by the famous L.D.BE. Which is the same system that owns institutes like Forman Christian College, Kinnaird College, and Cathedral schools Lahore.

References

External links
 Profile of Narowal District 
 UET's official website.
 Official Website of District Government Narowal
 Construction Company in Pakistan

Populated places in Narowal District